Captain Carleton Scott Young (October 21, 1905 – November 7, 1994) was an American character actor who was known for his deep voice.

Early years 
 
Born in Fulton, Oswego, New York, Young was the second and only surviving child of State Highway Civil Engineer Joseph Henry Young and Minna Emma Pauline "Minnie" Adler. His parents were married September 18, 1897, in Marlborough, Essex, Massachusetts. They were divorced by 1920. Neither ever remarried. Young's elder brother; Reginald Adler Young, lived for 26 days in 1902, and died of an acute infection and convulsions. Young grew up in Syracuse, New York, but was living in Ogden, Utah, with his divorced father by 1930.

Military service  
 
Young enlisted in the U. S. Army when he was age 35 as a Private in the Air Corps. When he left the service his rank was Captain.

Career
Young appeared in 235 American television and film roles, with his first being The Fighting Marines (1935). He ended his career in the 1973 television series The Magician, which starred Bill Bixby.  He was a member of the John Ford Stock Company.

Film 
Other films in which Young was cast include: Reefer Madness (1936), Navy Blues (1937), Dick Tracy (1937), Valley of the Sun (1942), Flying Leathernecks (1951), The Day the Earth Stood Still (1951), From Here to Eternity (1953),  Walt Disney's adaptation of Jules Verne's 20,000 Leagues Under the Sea (1954) as John Howard, and The Horse Soldiers (1959). He also played Billy the Kid's sidekick Jeff Travis in the first five entries in the B-movie Billy the Kid film series from 1940 to 1941.

Portraying a newspaper editor in The Man Who Shot Liberty Valance (1962), he spoke one of the most famous lines in Western film history: "No Sir, this is the West: When the legend becomes fact, print the legend." The same year, Young appeared in Alfred Hitchcock's North by Northwest (1959).

Radio 
His radio career included a brief star turn as the title role in a short-lived crime drama, The Whisperer (1951), somewhat loosely derived from the longtime crime hit The Whistler. Young played attorney Philip Gault, whose voice was destroyed in an accident, and who developed a sardonic whisper to compensate until his voice was restored, using a whispering persona to infiltrate the underworld, where he steered unsuspecting mobsters into the clutches of the law as represented by his real identity as a lawyer.

Young's other roles in radio programs included:

Television 
Other television programs in which Young was cast include: Schlitz Playhouse of Stars (1951), Boston Blackie (1953), ABC Album (1953), Racket Squad (1953), The Whistler (1954), The Adventures of Wild Bill Hickok (1955), Highway Patrol (1955) and The Donna Reed Show (1959).

Other activities 
Young had a few interests beyond acting, forming the Los Angeles Smog Corp. to manufacture cans of "Genuine Los Angeles Smog", which reportedly were sold in the "Fun Shop" at Farmers Market.  Hal Tamblin was listed as a vice president of the corporation, according to a 1962 item in The Times, and Art Ryon, author of The Times'  "Ham on Ryon" column, claimed to be an executive of the whimsical outfit.  Salesman Stan Goodman of Baldwinsville, NY, a longtime friend of Mr. Young, and his wife Noel, came up with the idea to sell the city's notoriously polluted air so tourists could take an authentic "slice" of Hollywood back home.  Goodman's grandson, attorney Robert C. Goodman of San Francisco, still owns one of the few extant cans of vintage LA smog captured in time by Young's Los Angeles Smog Corp.

Personal life
Young was married three times.  His first wife was Helen Virginia Haberbosch. She was born March 14, 1913, in Los Angeles County, California.  She died July 27, 1987, in Arcadia, Los Angeles, California. They were married September 31, 1931, in Santa Ana, Orange, California, and they were divorced before 1935. There is no record of any children born of this union.  His second wife is unknown but they were divorced before 1945. From 1945 until his death in 1994 he was married to Ngum Yee "Emma" Hom.  Her stage name was Noel Toy AKA the "Chinese Sally Rand". She was born December 27, 1918, in San Francisco, California, USA and died December 24, 2003, in Los Angeles, California, USA  They were married on December 20, 1945, in New York City. Noel Toy was an exotic dancer and actress whom he met when he caught her dance act at New York's Latin Quarter, and was smitten. They had no children.

Selected filmography

The Fighting Marines (1935, Serial) - Doctor [Ch. 4] (uncredited)
Black Gold (1936) - Oilfield Roughneck (uncredited)
Happy Go Lucky (1936) - Al
The Mandarin Mystery (1936) - Drunk (uncredited)
A Man Betrayed (1936) - Henchman Smokey
Reefer Madness (1936) - Jack
Larceny on the Air (1937) - Radio Announcer (uncredited)
Join the Marines (1937) - Corporal
Dick Tracy (1937, Serial) - Gordon Tracy, After
Round-Up Time in Texas (1937) - Strike Messenger (uncredited)
Circus Girl (1937) - Aerialist (uncredited)
Git Along Little Dogies (1937) - First Holdup Man
Navy Blues (1937) - Spencer
The Hit Parade (1937) - Radio Announcer (uncredited)
Michael O'Halloran (1937) - (uncredited)
Come On, Cowboys (1937) - Federal Prosecutor (uncredited)
Dangerous Holiday (1937) - Tango
It Could Happen to You (1937) - Thug (uncredited)
Atlantic Flight (1937) - Air Show Announcer (uncredited)
S.O.S. Coast Guard (1937) - Henchman Dodds [Ch. 4]
Stars Over Arizona (1937) - Henchman Curley (uncredited)
A Bride for Henry (1937) - Hotel Guest (uncredited)
She Married an Artist (1937) - Reporter (uncredited)
 Young Dynamite (1937) - Spike Dolan
Race Suicide (1938) - Parker
The Spy Ring (1938) - Polo Game Timekeeper (uncredited)
The Old Barn Dance (1938) - Peabody
Cassidy of Bar 20 (1938) - Jeff Caffrey
Rawhide (1938) - Reporter (uncredited)
Air Devils (1938) - Hotel Clerk (uncredited)
Gangs of New York (1938) - Nolan's Henchman (uncredited)
Gunsmoke Trail (1938) - Trampy Gambler at Roulette Table (uncredited)
The Fighting Devil Dogs (1938, Serial) - Johnson, 'Aurora' Crewman [Ch. 4]
The Marines Are Here (1938) - Navy Officer (uncredited)
Outlaw Express (1938) - Henchman Ramon
Prison Break (1938) - Prisoner (uncredited)
The Wages of Sin (1938) - Bruce
Heroes of the Hills (1938) - Connors
Black Bandit (1938) - Henchman Cash
Guilty Trails (1938) - Steve Yates
Prairie Justice (1938) - Dry-Gulch Baker
Gang Bullets (1938) - Hank Newell (uncredited)
Honor of the West (1939) - Russ Whitley
Convict's Code (1939) - Pete Jennings
Risky Business (1939) - Reporter (uncredited)
The Lone Ranger Rides Again (1939, Serial) - Logan (Ch. 1)
Smoky Trails (1939) - Henchman Mort
Buck Rogers (1939) - Scott
Code of the Streets (1939) - Eddie, lying trial witness (uncredited)
Mesquite Buckaroo (1939) - Sands 
Big Town Czar (1939) - Thompson, Luger Henchman (uncredited)
Stunt Pilot (1939) - Reporter Trent
Riders of the Sage (1939) - Luke Halsey 
Girl from Rio (1939) - Tony - Band Leader
Port of Hate (1939) - Don Cameron
Sued for Libel (1939) - Radio Actor (uncredited)
Torture Ship (1939) - Reporter (uncredited)
Trigger Fingers (1939) - Bert Lee, Gang Leader
The Pal from Texas (1939) - Fox
Flaming Lead (1939) - Hank (Rustler Leader)
El Diablo Rides (1939) - Herb Crenshaw
Zorro's Fighting Legion (1939, Serial) - Benito Juarez [ch 1-2, 12]
Adventure in Diamonds (1940) - Sailor (uncredited)
Pals of the Silver Sage (1940) - Jeff Grey
The Cowboy from Sundown (1940) - Nick Cuttler
Adventures of Red Ryder (1940) - Sheriff Dade
One Man's Law (1940) - Stevens (uncredited)
Billy the Kid Outlawed (1940) - Jeff Travis
 Gun Code (1940) - Henchman Slim Doyle
Up in the Air (1940) - Stevens
Billy the Kid in Texas (1940) - Gil Bonney aka Gil Cooper 
Take Me Back to Oklahoma (1940) - Ace Hutchinson
Pride of the Bowery (1940) - Norton - Fight Promoter (uncredited)
Billy the Kid's Gun Justice (1940) - Jeff Blanchard
Billy the Kid's Range War (1941) - Marshal Jeff Carson
Buck Privates (1941) - Supply Sergeant (uncredited)
Prairie Pioneers (1941) - Army Officer (uncredited)
Adventures of Captain Marvel (1941, Serial) - Henchman Martin [Ch. 3-9]
Two Gun Sheriff (1941) - Townsman (uncredited)
Billy the Kid's Fighting Pals (1941) - Jeff
Paper Bullets (1941) - Gangster Pokey Martin (uncredited)
Badlands of Dakota (1941) - Ben Mercer (uncredited)
Texas (1941) - Lashan Cowhand (uncredited)
Keep 'Em Flying (1941) - Orchestra Leader (uncredited)
A Missouri Outlaw (1941) - Henchman Luke Allen
Billy the Kid's Round-Up (1941) - Jeff
Thunder River Feud (1942) - Grover Harrison
Code of the Outlaw (1942) - Henchman
Valley of the Sun (1942) - Nolte (uncredited)
South of Santa Fe (1942) - Henchman Steve (uncredited)
Gang Busters (1942, Serial) - Highway Patrolman [Chs. 8, 11] (uncredited)
Spy Smasher (1942, Serial) - Taylor, Barn Thug [Ch. 3] / Power Clerk (uncredited)
Overland Mail (1942, Serial) - Lem, Henchman
King of the Mounties (1942, Serial) - Gus (ch's. 1-2) (uncredited)
Take It or Leave It (1944) - Program Director
Thunderhead, Son of Flicka (1945) - Maj. Harris
Blonde Alibi (1946) - Steward (uncredited)
Smash-Up: The Story of a Woman (1947) - Fred Elliott
American Guerrilla in the Philippines (1950) - Col. Elliott M. Phillips (uncredited)
Double Deal (1950) - Reno Sebastian
The Flying Missile (1950) - Colonel (uncredited)
Operation Pacific (1951) - Pilot Briefing Officers on Carrier (uncredited)
Gene Autry and the Mounties (1951) - Pierre Lablond
Best of the Badmen (1951) - Wilson
Chain of Circumstance (1951) - Lt. Sands
Flying Leathernecks (1951) - Col. Riley
People Will Talk (1951) - Technician (uncredited)
The Mob (1951) - District Attorney (uncredited)
The Day the Earth Stood Still (1951) - Colonel in Jeep (uncredited)
The Desert Fox: The Story of Rommel (1951) - German Staff Officer (uncredited)
Anne of the Indies (1951) - Pirate Mate
Red Mountain (1951) - Lt. Morgan
Boots Malone (1952) - Racing Steward (uncredited)
My Six Convicts (1952) - Capt. Haggarty
Deadline - U.S.A. (1952) - Crane, Garrison's Daughters' Lawyer (uncredited)
Diplomatic Courier (1952) - Brennan (uncredited)
The Brigand (1952) - Carnot
Washington Story (1952) - Congressional Clerk (uncredited)
Army Bound (1952) - Doctor
Toughest Man in Arizona (1952) - Cpl. Caxton (uncredited)
Battle Zone (1952) - Colonel
Kansas City Confidential (1952) - Martin
The Steel Trap (1952) - Briggs, airline clerk
Thunderbirds (1952) - Maj. Alberts (uncredited)
Torpedo Alley (1952) - Psychiatrist
Last of the Comanches (1953) - Maj. Lanning (uncredited)
Salome (1953) - Officer (uncredited)
San Antone (1953) - Confederate Office (uncredited)
Man in the Dark (1953) - Assistant Surgeon (uncredited)
Goldtown Ghost Riders (1953) - Jim Granby
The Glory Brigade (1953) - Captain Hal Davis (uncredited)
Safari Drums (1953) - Colin
Cruisin' Down the River (1953) - Doctor (uncredited)
A Blueprint for Murder (1953) - Ship's Det. Frank Connelly (uncredited)
No Escape (1953) - Don Holden
From Here to Eternity (1953) - Col. Ayres (uncredited)
Mexican Manhunt (1953) - Slick Caruthers
The Glenn Miller Story (1954) - Adjutant General (uncredited)
Riot in Cell Block 11 (1954) - Guard Captain Barrett
Bitter Creek (1954) - Quentin Allen
Loophole (1954) - Lie Detector Technician (uncredited)
Prince Valiant (1954) - Herald (uncredited)
Arrow in the Dust (1954) - Maj. Andy Pepperis
Rogue Cop (1954) - Dist. Atty. Powell (uncredited)
Woman's World (1954) - Executive Reception Guest (uncredited)
20,000 Leagues Under the Sea (1954) - John Howard
Black Tuesday (1954) - Radio Broadcaster (voice, uncredited)
Battle Cry (1955) - Maj. Jim Wellman - Battalion Executive Officer
The Racers (1955) - Opening Narrator (uncredited)
Seven Angry Men (1955) - Judge (uncredited)
Daddy Long Legs (1955) - Commission Member (uncredited)
Artists and Models (1955) - Col. Drury (uncredited)
The Court-Martial of Billy Mitchell (1955) - Pershing's Aide (uncredited)
The Bottom of the Bottle (1956) - Gossipy Woman's Husband (uncredited)
Battle Stations (1956) - Rear Admiral (uncredited)
Great Day in the Morning (1956) - Col. Gibson 
While the City Sleeps (1956) - Police Interrogator (uncredited)
Miami Exposé (1956) - Carruthers
Beyond a Reasonable Doubt (1956) - Allan Kirk
Flight to Hong Kong (1956) - Commander Larrabee (uncredited)
Julie (1956) - Airport control tower official
Three Brave Men (1956) - Board Chairman (uncredited)
Official Detective (1957) TV series - episode "Bombing Terror" as Cornball Whittaker
The Book of Acts Series (1957) - Jesus Christ
Battle Hymn (1957) - Major Harrison
The True Story of Jesse James (1957) - Neighboring Farmer (uncredited)
The Spirit of St. Louis (1957) - Captain at Brooks Field Flight School (uncredited)
Run of the Arrow (1957) - Surgeon (uncredited)
Jet Pilot (1957) - Technical Sergeant in Palmer Field Control Tower (uncredited)
Cry Terror! (1958) - Roger Adams
The Perfect Furlough (1958) - Maj. Morrow (uncredited)
The Last Hurrah (1958) - Winslow
Here Come the Jets (1959) - Burton
The Horse Soldiers (1959) - Col. Jonathan Miles
North by Northwest (1959) - Fenning Nelson (uncredited)
It Started with a Kiss (1959) - McVey (uncredited)
Wake Me When It's Over (1960) - Radar Instructor (uncredited)
Sergeant Rutledge (1960) - Capt. Shattuck
The Music Box Kid (1960) - George Gordon (uncredited)
The Gallant Hours (1960) - Col. Evans Carlson
Spartacus (1960) - Herald (uncredited)
The Big Show (1961) - Judge Richter
Armored Command (1961) - Capt. Bart Macklin
Twenty Plus Two (1961) - Colonel
The Man Who Shot Liberty Valance (1962) - Maxwell Scott
How the West Was Won (1962) - Poker Player with Cleve (uncredited)
A Tiger Walks (1964) - Colonel (uncredited)
Cheyenne Autumn (1964) - Carl Schurz's Aide (uncredited)

References

External links

Villains and Supporting Players: Carleton Young

1905 births
1994 deaths
American male film actors
American male television actors
20th-century American male actors
Male actors from New York City